Eois alticola is a moth in the family Geometridae. It is found in Equatorial Guinea and Kenya.

References

Moths described in 1925
Eois
Moths of Africa